Seton Hill Historic District is a historic district in Baltimore, Maryland.  It was listed on the National Register of Historic Places in 1975.

It includes St. Mary's Seminary Chapel, which is a National Historic Landmark.  It also includes Mother Seton House, briefly home of St. Elizabeth Ann Seton, separately listed on the National Register.

Seton Hill, Baltimore's former second French Quarter, is centered on the former St. Mary's Seminary and College, which was founded by Sulpician priests fleeing the French Revolution (1789-1795) around 1791. Today Saint Mary's Park is situated where the former Seminary and College buildings once stood. The neighborhood was designated as an Historic and Architectural Preservation District of Baltimore City in 1968, and was placed on the National Register of Historic Places in 1975. Saint Mary's Park, the heart of Seton Hill, is the largest open green space in downtown Baltimore on its Westside. In 1790, the first Roman Catholic prelate ordained for the new United States, Bishop John Carroll met with Father Nagot of the Order of St. Sulpice and agreed to a plan for the establishment of the Sulpician Order in Maryland. A year later priests of the order, journeyed across the Atlantic Ocean with Fathers Nagot, Tessier, Garnier, and Levadoux opening the Sulpician headquarters in the old One Mile Tavern, then located at West Franklin Street and the Hookstown Road, (known today as Pennsylvania Avenue). The Sulpicians soon purchased the inn, adapting it to a small seminary, and in future years they completed an extensive college and seminary complex along North Paca Street in the area of the existing Seminary structures in 1806, with a second replacement group of buildings in the 1870s. St. Mary's thus became the first Roman Catholic seminary in the United States, celebrating its 175th Anniversary there in 1966 (four years before they were razed in 1970 creating the current park) at its older Paca Street campus of Victorian architecture   which it had left in 1929 for its later elaborate Beaux Arts / Classical Revival style architecture and expansive campus on Roland Avenue and Northern Parkway in the Roland Park neighborhood of North Baltimore. There it later celebrated its Bicentennial in 1991. The only original St. Mary's academic structure remaining is a particularly significant building located on the old Seminary grounds is a small red brick chapel, the Chapel of Our Lady of the Presentation, which was dedicated in 1808. This structure, designed by J. Maximilen M. Godefroy, a prominent architect of the time and teacher at the secular college attached to the seminary, is one of the oldest remaining example of Gothic Revival architecture in the U.S.

Frenchman Godefroy also designed several other structures including the city's War of 1812 memorial to its casualties of the Battle of Baltimore during the British attack in September 1814 of the iconic landmark Battle Monument (1815-1822), situated at the old colonial era Courthouse Square on North Calvert Street, between East Fayette and East Lexington Streets. It commemorates the Battle of North Point in southeast Baltimore County and the Royal Navy's bombardment of Fort McHenry guarding the Baltimore Harbor & Port. The monument serves as a symbol of the city on the municipal seal and city flag and logo to this day since 1827. Plus the First Unitarian and Universalist Church at West Franklin & North Charles Street in 1817 a

References

External links

, including photo dated 1975, at Maryland Historical Trust, and accompanying map

French-American culture in Baltimore
French communities
Historic districts on the National Register of Historic Places in Baltimore
Seton Hill, Baltimore